The Stephen B. Quillen House is a historic home located at Lebanon, Russell County, Virginia. It was built in 1912, and is a two-story, frame Queen Anne style dwelling.  It has a steep hipped roof with lower cross gables, a wraparound first floor porch, and simple door and window treatment.

It was listed on the National Register of Historic Places in 2003.

References

Houses on the National Register of Historic Places in Virginia
Queen Anne architecture in Virginia
Houses completed in 1912
Houses in Russell County, Virginia
National Register of Historic Places in Russell County, Virginia
1912 establishments in Virginia